The women's 71 kilograms competition at the 2022 World Weightlifting Championships was held on 11 and 12 December 2022.

Schedule

Medalists

Records

Results

References

Women's 71 kg
World Championships